Gerald Michael McGuinness (born 14 September 1953) is a Scottish rugby coach and former player who won seven caps for Scotland playing as a prop forward.

Rugby Union career

Amateur career

In 1977 he played for West of Scotland. In 1987 he moved to Hawick RFC.

Provincial career

He was capped by Glasgow District while still with West of Scotland.

In 1987 played for the South of Scotland.

International career

McGuinness's first international match was against Australia at Brisbane on 4 July 1982, Scotland's first victory in a full international match in the Southern hemisphere. The last of his seven caps was against England at Twickenham on 16 March 1985.

He played one match for Barbarians FC in 1988.

Coaching career

He started youth development work in 2007 at Hawick RFC. He became Hawick head coach in 2009 and despite the club being promoted to the Scottish Premiership Division One, he was sacked the following year.

He then joined Scottish Premiership Division Two side Peebles as assistant coach, although left the club in 2012.

References

1953 births
Living people
Barbarian F.C. players
Hawick RFC players
Scotland international rugby union players
Scottish rugby union coaches
Scottish rugby union players
South of Scotland District (rugby union) players
Rugby union players from Glasgow
West of Scotland FC players
Glasgow District (rugby union) players